The following is a list of awards and nominations received by television host, actor, director, producer, writer and lyricist James Lipton.

Primetime Emmy Awards

Critics' Choice Television Awards

Daytime Emmy Awards

Producers Guild of America Awards

CableACE Award

External links 
 List of awards and nominations received by James Lipton at the Internet Movie Database.

Lists of awards received by American actor